Jatiya Kabi Bira Kishore Government and Junior College also known as J.K.B.K College is a state run co-ed autonomous undergraduate (arts, commerce and science) and junior +2 (arts, commerce and science) government college located at OMP campus of city Cuttack. The undergraduate arts course include Humanities. The college is maintained by Department of Higher Education, Odisha and is affiliated to run its undergraduate course curriculum under Utkal University and for class 11th and 12th science course under Council of Higher Secondary Education, Odisha.

References

Department of Higher Education, Odisha
Autonomous Colleges of Odisha
Universities and colleges in Odisha
Education in Cuttack
Educational institutions established in 1972
1972 establishments in Orissa
Utkal University
Junior colleges in India